Yang Houlan (born May 1956) was a Chinese diplomat. He was born in Enshi, Hubei. He was a graduate of Wuhan University and George Washington University. He was Ambassador of the People's Republic of China to Afghanistan (2007–2009), Nepal (2011–2013) and Myanmar (2013–2015). He was Ambassador for Korean Peninsula Affairs of the Ministry of Foreign Affairs of the People's Republic of China (2009–2011).

External links
杨厚兰大使简历

References 

1956 births
Living people
Ambassadors of China to Afghanistan
Ambassadors of China to Nepal
Ambassadors of China to Myanmar
Wuhan University alumni
George Washington University alumni
People from Enshi
Date of birth missing (living people)